The Guards Trophy was an Intercontinental Formula motor race held on 7 August 1961 at Brands Hatch Circuit. The race was run over 76 laps of the circuit, and was won by Australian driver Jack Brabham in a Cooper T53-Climax. Brabham lapped the entire field. Jim Clark in a Lotus 18-Climax was second and Graham Hill in a BRM P48 was third. Bruce McLaren in another T53 set fastest lap and finished fourth. Stirling Moss qualified in pole position but retired with gearbox problems.

This was the final Intercontinental Formula race. The formula had been overshadowed by the new 1.5 litre Formula One championship and was quietly abandoned.

Results

References

Guards Trophy
Guards Trophy
Guards Trophy